Grove City Christian School is a private, Christian high school in Grove City, Ohio.

Background
Grove City Christian School opened in 1990.
The mission of GCCS is to partner with Bible-believing families and their churches in providing the spiritual and academic foundation that cultivates, transforms and prepares students to be Christian leaders who impact their world.

External links
 School Website
 School Athletics website

Notes and references

High schools in Franklin County, Ohio
Educational institutions established in 1990
Private high schools in Ohio
Private middle schools in Ohio
Private elementary schools in Ohio
1990 establishments in Ohio